Ejike Christopher Ugboaja (born 28 May 1985) is a Nigerian professional basketball player who last played for BC Mark Mentors of the Nigerian Premier Basketball League (NPBL). He is also the founder of Ejike Ugboaja Foundation.

Professional career
Ugboaja was selected in the 2006 NBA draft by the National Basketball Association's Cleveland Cavaliers, in the second round with the 55th pick overall. He was a member of the Cavaliers during the 2006–07 season, but did not play in any regular season games with the team. He played in the 2nd-tier Eurocup with Azovmash Mariupol and with BC Odessa.

Nigerian national team
Ugboaja competed at the 2006 Commonwealth Games, the 2007 FIBA Africa Championship, the 2009 FIBA Africa Championship, and the 2011 FIBA Africa Championship with Nigeria. He also played at the 2012 Summer Olympics, with the senior men's Nigerian national basketball team.

References

External links
NBA.com Profile
Eurocup Profile
NBA D-League Profile
FIBA Profile
Asia-Basket.com Profile
Draftexpress.com Profile

1985 births
Living people
African Games bronze medalists for Nigeria
African Games gold medalists for Nigeria
African Games medalists in basketball
Anaheim Arsenal players
APOEL B.C. players
Basketball players at the 2006 Commonwealth Games
Basketball players at the 2012 Summer Olympics
BC Azovmash players
BC Juventus players
Cleveland Cavaliers draft picks
Commonwealth Games competitors for Nigeria
Competitors at the 2007 All-Africa Games
İstanbul Teknik Üniversitesi B.K. players
Nigerian expatriate basketball people in Iran
Nigerian expatriate basketball people in Spain
Nigerian expatriate basketball people in Turkey
Nigerian expatriate basketball people in the United States
Nigerian expatriates in Cyprus
Nigerian expatriates in Poland
Nigerian expatriate sportspeople in Ukraine
Nigerian men's basketball players
Olympic basketball players of Nigeria
Petrochimi Bandar Imam BC players
Power forwards (basketball)
Sportspeople from Lagos